The following lists events that happened during 2011 in Mauritania.

Incumbents
President: Mohamed Ould Abdel Aziz
Prime Minister: Moulaye Ould Mohamed Laghdaf

Events

January
 January 17 - A woman is sentenced to six months imprisonment in Mauritania for keeping two children in slave-like conditions.

February
 February 2 - The army in Mauritania destroy a car packed with explosives outside the capital Nouakchott, killing three people suspected of being members of al-Qaeda in the Islamic Maghreb.

April
 April 25 - Hundreds of people demonstrating during a "day of rage" against the regime of President Mohamed Ould Abdel Aziz are tear gassed by police, while others are arrested and opposition MPs deterred from joining the protests.

June
 June 25 - Forces from Mauritania and Mali clash with al-Qaeda militants in Mali, destroying a base; several bodies are later found.

References

 
2010s in Mauritania
Years of the 21st century in Mauritania
Mauritania
Mauritania